Luxembourg  is known for opening local television and radio stations in other countries. RTL Group is operated in many countries. Luxembourg is the home of the world's biggest satellite company, SES, located in Betzdorf.

Statistics

 Telephones - main lines in use: 314,700 (1999)
 Telephones - mobile cellular: 215,741 (2000)
 Telephone system: highly developed, completely automated and efficient system, mainly buried cables
 domestic: nationwide cellular telephone system; buried cable
 international: 3 channels leased on TAT-6 coaxial submarine cable (Europe to North America)
 Radio broadcast stations: AM 2, FM 9, shortwave 2 (1999)
 Radios: 285,000 (1997)
 Television broadcast stations: 5 (1999)
 Televisions: 285,000 (1998 est.)
 Internet Service Providers (ISPs): 8 (2000) Note: Work has started in 2006 on a citywide WiFi project called Hotcity.
 Internet users: 100,000 (2001)
 Country code (Top-level domain): .lu

References

(49° 41'36 N; 6° 19'45 E)

 
Luxembourg